The 2014 Latrobe City Traralgon ATP Challenger 2 was a professional tennis tournament played on outdoor hard court. It was the third edition of the tournament which was part of the 2014 ATP Challenger Tour. It took place in Traralgon, Australia between 3 – 9 November 2014. It was the second of two Traralgon Challengers in 2014.

Singles main draw entrants

Seeds

 Rankings are as of October 27, 2014.

Other entrants
The following players received wildcards into the singles main draw:
  Jake Eames
  Omar Jasika
  Gavin van Peperzeel
  Darren Polkinghorne

The following players received protected entry into the singles main draw:
  Greg Jones
  Jose Statham

The following players received entry from the qualifying draw:
  Marcus Daniell
  Christopher O'Connell
  Artem Sitak
  Bai Yan

Champions

Singles

  John Millman def.  James Ward, 6–4, 6–1

Doubles

  Brydan Klein /  Dane Propoggia def.  Marcus Daniell /  Artem Sitak, 7–6(8–6), 3–6, [10–6]

References

External links
 Tournament Website
 ATP official site

Latrobe City Traralgon ATP Challenger 2
Latrobe City Traralgon ATP Challenger
Latrobe City Traralgon ATP Challenger 2